Churi Willk'i (Aymara churi dull yellow, willk'i gap "dull yellow gap", also spelled Churi Willkhi) is a  mountain in the Andes of Bolivia. It is located in the La Paz Department, Pacajes Province, Calacoto Municipality. Pukara lies north of the Anallajsi volcano, south of the mountain Urqipi and north-east of the mountain Pukara.

References 

Mountains of La Paz Department (Bolivia)